Three Sailors (French: Trois de la marine) is a 1957 French comedy film directed by Maurice de Canonge and starring Marcel Merkès, Henri Génès and Jeannette Batti.

The film was made at the Victorine Studios in Nice with sets designed by the art director Claude Bouxin. It was shot in Eastmancolor.

Cast
 Marcel Merkès as Antonin Brémond  
 Henri Génès as Honoré  
 Jeannette Batti as Angèle  
 Jean Carmet as Papillote  
 Colette Deréal as Patricia  
 Paulette Merval as Mireille  
 Jean-Roger Caussimon as Éric Bergen  
 Jean Murat as Le chef des services secrets  
 Victoria Marino as Peppina  
 René Sarvil as Arsène 
 Les Ballets de Mary-Jo Weldon as Themselves 
 Pierre Janin 
 Philippe Janvier 
 Josselin
 Jonny Mary
 Milly Mathis

See also
 Three Sailors (1934)

References

Bibliography 
 Goble, Alan. The Complete Index to Literary Sources in Film. Walter de Gruyter, 1999.

External links 
 

1957 films
1957 comedy films
French comedy films
1950s French-language films
Films directed by Maurice de Canonge
Seafaring films
Remakes of French films
Films based on operettas
Films shot at Victorine Studios
1950s French films